Joshua Caleb Johnson is an American child actor. After appearing in several television shows and short films, he gained attention when he starred as Henry 'Onion' Shackleford in the 2020 television series The Good Lord Bird.

Filmography

Film

Television

Video game

Accolades

References

External links
 

21st-century American male actors
American male television actors
American male child actors
Living people
Place of birth missing (living people)
Year of birth missing (living people)